Reek of Putrefaction is the debut album by British extreme metal band Carcass. It was released by Earache Records in July 1988.

Background
When released, Reek of Putrefaction reached No. 6 on the UK Indie Chart, establishing Carcass as one of the pioneers of the grindcore genre. The late BBC Radio 1 DJ John Peel declared it his favourite album of 1988, in an interview for British newspaper The Observer.

Guitarist/vocalist Bill Steer retrospectively said that "The first album wasn’t very focused, it was just about being fast and heavy…".

He went on to say that the band did not intend the muddy sound present throughout the album: "The first one obviously is a crazy accident. It’s got a small following but we did not intend to make that record the thing that people hear now. We had different ideas and we just couldn’t execute them. We were too young, too naïve and inexperienced. From 'Symphonies' onwards, we got better at achieving the things we wanted to achieve in the studio."

Production
Reek of Putrefaction was recorded in four days at Ritch Bitch Studios in Birmingham. According to guitarist Bill Steer, the studio's engineer "ruined" the record, especially its drum tracks. Carcass had only had a few hours available of mixing, so they had to release the LP as it was to meet the label's deadline. The band were "everything but happy" with the result, declared Steer.

When the master recording was first sent to the pressing plant, the original vinyl LP had to be pressed at lower volumes, because the bass frequencies were so low (sometimes reaching 25 Hz) that they were in danger of rendering higher frequencies inaudible.

Releases
Reek of Putrefaction was first released in 1988. The original album cover consisted of a collage of autopsy photographs collected from medical journals. Reek of Putrefaction was re-released in 1994 with a "clean" cover. In 2002, the album was reissued with a censored outer cover proclaiming "Original artwork contained inside".

The album was re-released in 2008 as part of an ongoing series of Carcass reissues to tie in with their reunion. The main album, along with the demo Flesh Ripping Sonic Torment, is presented as one side of a dualdisc, while the DVD side features the first part of an extended documentary titled The Pathologist's Report Part I: Incubation. Later editions contain the album on a CD and the documentary on a separate DVD. The album is presented in a 12-panel digipak with full lyrics and artwork and is sealed in a white medical bag with sticker, to hide the controversial cover art.

Track listing

Personnel
 Frenzied Fornicator of Fetid Fetishes and Sickening Grisly Fetes – bass, lead vocals
 Gratuitously Brutal Asphyxiator of Ulcerated Pyoaxanthous Goitres – guitars, co-lead vocals
 Grume Gargler and Eviscerator of Matured Neoplasm – drums, backing vocals
 Sanjiv – lead vocals (tracks 23–35)

Charts

References 

Earache Records albums
Carcass (band) albums
1988 debut albums